The Los Lagartos Open or Abierto Internacional de Los Lagartos is a golf tournament that has been held at Los Lagartos Country Club in Bogotá, Colombia since 1964.

Between 1964 and 1974, it was a fixture on the PGA Tour-sponsored Caribbean Tour. Several major champions won the event, including Art Wall Jr., Roberto De Vicenzo, and Tony Jacklin. The event has been referred to as the Los Lagartos International.

Winners

References 

Golf tournaments in Colombia
Sports competitions in Bogotá